Madhusree Dutta is an Indian filmmaker, author and curator.

Life and education
Madhusree Dutta was born in the industrial town of Jamshedpur, Jharkhand (then Bihar). She has studied Economics at Jadavpur University, Kolkata and Dramatics at National School of Drama, New Delhi. In 1987 Dutta shifted her base to Mumbai (called Bombay in 1987).

Dutta was jury in Berlinale (Berlin International Film Festival) Shorts in 2015; Feminale: International Women's Film Festival, Cologne in 2006; Message to Man International Documentary Film Festival, St. Petersburg in 2001; and was chair person of the jury in International Documentary and Short Film Festival of Kerala in 2009; and SIGNS Festival of Digital Videos in 2014. Her retrospectives were held in MIFF (Mumbai International Documentary Festival), 2018; Persistence Resistance Film Festival, Delhi in 2008; Madurai Film Festival in 2007; NGBK Gallery; Berlin in 2001.

Currently she lives in Cologne, Germany. She has joined as the Artistic Director of Akademie der Kunste der Welt in Cologne since 2018.

Dutta has been selected for the Lifetime Achievement Award for documentaries in connection with the 12th International Documentary and Short Film Festival of Kerala (IDSFFK) to be held from June 21 to 26.

Work 

Madhusree Dutta brought art practices, activism and pedagogy together in one platform as early as in 1990 when she curated EXPRESSION, the first feminist arts festival. The festival witnessed coming together of feminist scholars, women artists and women's movement activists, and is regarded as a landmark in the history of feminism in India. Her works generally contemplates on gender construction, urban development, public arts and documentary practices. Most of her works are situated within a hybrid form engaging multiple genres and a provocative mixing of high art and low art. Her works often display a flamboyant mix of pedagogical, political and experimental indicating towards her multiple identities as political activist and avant garde artist. Some of the artists, across disciplines and practices, whom she has collaborated with are filmmaker Philip Scheffner and photo artist Ines Schaber from Berlin, theater director Anuradha Kapur from Delhi, visual artist Nilima Sheikh from Baroda and Archana Hande and architect Rohan Shivkumar from Mumbai, playwright Malini Bhattacharya from Kolkata.

The same pursuit has also led to several digital archiving projects and pedagogical initiatives. One such project Godaam is available online in the free access site PADMA (Public Access Digital Media Archive).

Madhusree Dutta is a co-founder of Majlis (1990), an institution that works on cultural activism and women's rights in Mumbai. She functioned as executive director of the institution till March 2016. She is also a founding member of Akademie Der Künste Der Welt (Academy of Arts of the World) in Cologne and member of the academic council of School of Environment & Architecture, Mumbai. She has been an active member of the women's movement in India and the World Social Forum (WSF) process, and has made major contribution by producing, mobilizing and disseminating arts and artists for the movements.

On 5 October 2015 she participated in a nationwide movement spearheaded by the writers and filmmakers of India to protest against the cultural policy of the state and returned the National Awards as part of the protest.

Theatre 

Dutta began her career with a Bengali theatre group Anarjya (non-Aryans) in Kolkata. She was also a member of cadre of Sachetana, a feminist group in Kolkata. For Anarjya and Sachetana she directed plays both for proscenium and street theatre. A Bengali adaptation of Bertolt Brecht's Mother Courage and Her Children, and an anti-dowry musical by Malini Bhattacharya – Meye Dile Sajiye (Giving Away the Girl)  are considered as two most memorable directorial works of her during that period. In Mumbai too she was active in theatre for a few years before getting fully involved with visual arts. She directed a popular street play for the women's movement – Nari Itihas ki Talash mein  (In search of Women's History) in 1988 and an adaptation of Aristophanes’ Lysistrata – Aaj Pyar Bandh  (Love is on Strike) in 1991.  She has even dabbled with television serial in her salad days and directed a 13-episode Gujarati serial for her friend producer-actor Meenal Patel (1989–1990).

Films 
The first film made by her is I Live in Behrampada (1993). The documentary made on a Muslim ghetto in the context of communal riots in Mumbai 1992-93 received Filmfare Award for best documentary in 1994. The film turned out to be a serious discursive material for conflict study and the script of it was published in an anthology - Politics of Violence: From Ayodhya to Behrampada, eds. John McGuire, Peter Reeves and Howard Brasted, Sage Publication, 1996. Subsequently, she has made several films – documentary, shorts, video spots and non-fiction features. Most of her films are made with the same unit comprising cameraman Avijit Mukul Kishore and editor Shyamal Karmakar. Her 2006 film Seven Islands and A Metro, on the city of Bombay / Mumbai was one of the first documentary films to have been commercially released in the theatres in India. Apart from making her own films she has also produced several documentaries for younger filmmakers. Her role as a pedagogue, mentor, and producer has helped to consolidate a peer group around documentary practices in Mumbai. Her films had received three National Film Awards.

Curatorial practices 

Project Cinema City: Research Art and Documentary Practices, a research project with multi-disciplinary interfaces of arts, is curated by her in 2009-2013. The project enquires into various layers of relationship between the city of Mumbai and the cinema that it manufactures. The project primarily argues for cinema to be regarded as a labour-intensive phenomenon that is connected to labour migration, post-industrial norm of sweatshop production, shifts in urban demography and urban development, access to technology and market etc. The project outputs contain documentary films production, public art installations, pedagogical courses, publications, and archives. The project was first exhibited at Berlinale (Berlin International Film Festival) -Forum Expanded as part of the 60th anniversary of the festival in 2010. Subsequently, it was exhibited in the galleries of National Gallery of Modern Art in Mumbai, Delhi, and Bangalore as well as in several smaller galleries and public places in 2011-14

Publications 

 Project Cinema City, co-edited with Kaushik Bhaumik and Rohan Shivkumar, Tulika Books, 2013 / Columbia University Press
Arjun Appadurai, social-cultural anthropologist, wrote in the foreword of the book - '"The work of the Cinema City group may be seen as a Situationist move, no longer in the context of Paris in the 1950s and 1960s, but of Bombay in the 1990s and in the decade of the twenty-first century. Like the Situationists, the Cinema City group is not concerned with art as comment on the city but as a product of the city, a lens into urban life and re-situating its already existing visual elements."  Project Cinema City, an anthology of essays, graphics, annotated films and art works was adjudged the Best Printed Book of the Year in Publishing Next Industry Award, 2014.
 dates.sites: Bombay / Mumbai (co-designed with Shilpa Gupta), Tulika Books, Columbia University Press, 2012, a graphic timeline of the public cultures in the 20th century.
 The Nation, the State and Indian Identity, co-edited with Flavia Agnes and Neera Adarkar, Samya of Bhatkal and Sen, in 1996. It is an anthology of essays in the context of the demolition of Babri Masjid in December 1992.
 KEYWORDING: Notes on Enculturation of Words and Word Practice within the Image Archive, with Berlin-based artist Ines Schaber. It is a book making endeavour, conceived as part of Living Archive Project to commemorate the 50th anniversary of  – Berlin
 In her pursuit for newer and subversive forms, Dutta has also produced a popular CDrom game Spice Adventures, in collaboration with artist Shilpa Gupta. The interactive narrative, with games and animation, unveils the secret of Indian cuisine – spices that have migrated to India from all over the world.

Awards 

 1996, 2001 National Film Award, India
 Second Best Film Award, International Video Fest, 1995;
 Best Public Service Advertisement Award, 1998;
 Best Script award in Shanghai International Film Festival, 2001;
IDPA Awards for best Kannada film and best Bengali film, 2001;
HIVOS Culture Award for Asia region, 2005
 Special Jury Award in Film Southasia, 2007;
John Abrahan Best Documentary award (as producer), 2012;
 Kölner Kulturpreis "Cultural Manager of the year 2018", Kölner Kulturpreis, 2019 www.koelnerkulturrat.de
 "Lifetime Achievement Award", International Documentary and Short Film Festival of Kerala (IDSFFK)Award for filmmaker Madhusree Dutta
 and several citizens’ awards.

References

External links 

 Official Website
  https://www.researchgate.net/publication/254079080_Documentary_Acts_An_Interview_with_Madhusree_Dutta  https://www.uctv.tv/shows/7-Islands-a-Metro-with-Director-Madhusree-Dutta-31806  http://www.india-seminar.com/2014/657/657_mad Official Website of Majlis, Cultural Center

Research Gate: an interview about Madhusree Duttas documentary work
 University of California: Interview about "7 Islands and a Metro"
 Junoon - A Stage for Theatre: Interview & Artist Talk (video)
 Indian Seminar: Popular cinema and public culture in Bombay
 Newsclick Production: "Film as a Medium for Social Change" (article & video)
 Urban Lens Film Festival 2016:  "Manufactured Realities: Triumph of the Film" (panel discussion, video)

1959 births
Living people
Indian women filmmakers
Indian filmmakers
Artists from Jharkhand
Indian feminists
Indian curators
Situationists
People from Jamshedpur